Surgical knots (ligatures) are the knots used to bind suture materials together while binding tissue in surgery.  They are used in medical and veterinary settings.

History

Surgical knots have been used since the first century when they were described by Greek physician Heraklas in a monograph on surgical knots and slings.  In the past, the training of astronauts has included the tying of surgical knots.

Application
The effective tying of surgical knots is a critical skill for surgeons since if the knot does not stay intact, the consequences may be serious such as after pulmonary resection, laparoscopic cholecystectomy, and hysterectomy. The primary goal of surgical knot tying is to allow the capacity of a knot (or ligature) to be tightened and remain tight. Ligatures are locked and finished multiple overhand knots. Nevertheless, slipping sometimes happens before the addition of the final knot, particularly during an instrument tie.

Knots
The constrictor knot is the knot most used for binding. The constrictor knot closely resembles the clove hitch except the two ends form an overhand knot under the overriding turn. New knots have been described. Other commonly employed knots are surgeon's knot, modified surgeon's knot, single-double other side knot, strangle knot and modified miller's knot. The Surgeon's knot has been a standard ligature but in one study it demonstrated slippage.
While the suture is being put in place a knot is used to secure the suture.  Tying the knot may be done inside the body or outside the body. Of these two options knot tying inside the body takes some time to learn because the surgeon is required to use laparoscopic instrumentation rather than their fingers to loop the suture.  Tying the knot outside the body is simpler for most surgeons because the suture is looped with fingers as in traditional tying.  Each knot formed has to be guided through a laparoscopic cannula and made tight with a knot-pusher to create the knot.

In laparoscopic surgery, a stronger braided suture is often preferred if the knot pusher is used because suture fraying is a side effect of this technique.  A disadvantage of knot tying being done outside the body is that it often causes more tension and can cause tissue tearing while suturing delicate tissue.

Alternatives and risks
An alternative to the surgical knot is a disposable clip that is placed at the end of the suture to keep stitches secure. A hemoclip is a titanium V-shaped clip with extensions that are squeezed together during application. The clips are available in various sizes and were originally designed to compress vessels for hemostasis.

Tying a surgical knot is done inside the body or outside the body. Learning to tie a surgical knot inside the body is slightly more difficult and has a steeper learning curve.  This is because the surgeon uses laparoscopic instruments. Tying the knot outside the body is simpler for most because the suturing is with fingers as in traditional tying. When a surgical knot is formed outside the body it must be drawn into a laparoscopic cannula. Stronger braided suturing thread is preferred because the knot has a tendency to fray as it is slid down the cannula.  At the end of the running suture line, clips can be placed across the suture tail. Barbed suture is a knotless surgical suture that has a pattern of barbs on its surface. These barbs lock the suture into the tissue, eliminating the tying of knots. Barbed sutures are typically used in cosmetic and reconstructive surgery. There are concerns that knot tying may be related to glove puncture but a current study demonstrated that instead friction from continuous suturing only left ‘marks’ on the little finger with no glove puncture.

Training
Much effort goes into the training of medical students regarding the surgical skill of knot tying. One method, called “Quiet Eye Training” has shown greater success than more traditional forms of instruction.

See also
 List of bend knots
 List of binding knots
 List of knots
 List of surgeries by type

References

External links
 Surgical Knots, Animated Surgical Knots 
Surgical procedures and techniques
Surgical stitches